Rezwanul Haque Idu Chowdhury (1930 – 25 May 1994) was a politician from the Thakurgaon District of Bangladesh and a former Member of Parliament of Dinajpur-3 and  Thakurgaon-1.

Career
Haque was elected to parliament from Dinajpur-3 as a Bangladesh Nationalist Party candidate in 1979.  He joined the Jatiya Party in 1986 and elected to parliament from Thakurgaon-1 as a Jatiya Party candidate in 1986 and 1988. He was the former Minister of Social Welfare.

Personal life 
Chowdhury was married to Sultana Rezwan Chowdhury, daughter of Haji Mohammad Danesh.

References

Bangladesh Nationalist Party politicians
1930 births
2nd Jatiya Sangsad members
Jatiya Party politicians
3rd Jatiya Sangsad members
4th Jatiya Sangsad members
People from Thakurgaon District
1994 deaths
Date of birth missing